Change Will Come was recorded at Record Plant Studio in NYC where Elliott Murphy had recorded his first album Aquashow. Murphy worked with producer James A. Ball and featured special guest vocalist Shawn Colvin and Jim Babjak of The Smithereens on 12 String Guitar.

Track listing
All tracks composed by Elliott Murphy

"Change Will Come"
"Many Can Read (Few Can Reason)"
"Chain of Pain"
"The Eyes of the Children of Maria"
"Something Ain't Right"
"And That's Called Insanity"
"Theme Song"
"Acting So Friendly"
"Feel That Way" 
"The Goodbye Song"
"Time Flies"

Personnel
Elliott Murphy - vocals, guitar, harmonica, keyboards
Tommy Mandel - piano, keyboards
Lewis King - drums
Ernie Brooks - bass
Shawn Colvin - vocals
Jim Babjak - 12-string guitar
Paul Prestopino - mandolin

References

1987 albums
Elliott Murphy albums
Albums recorded at Record Plant (New York City)